Ride on Vaquero is a 1941 American Western film directed by Herbert I. Leeds and written by Samuel G. Engel. The film stars Cesar Romero, Mary Beth Hughes, Lynne Roberts, Chris-Pin Martin, Robert Lowery and Ben Carter. The film was released on April 18, 1941, by 20th Century Fox.

Cast 
Cesar Romero as Cisco Kid
Mary Beth Hughes as Sally
Lynne Roberts as Marquerita
Chris-Pin Martin as Gordito
Robert Lowery as Carlos
Ben Carter as Watchman
William Demarest as Barney
Robert Shaw as Cavalry Officer 
Edwin Maxwell as Clark
Paul Sutton as Sleepy
Don Costello as Redge
Arthur Hohl as Sheriff
Irving Bacon as Baldy
Dick Rich as Curly
Paul Harvey as Colonel
Joan Woodbury as Dolores

References

External links 

1941 films
20th Century Fox films
American Western (genre) films
1941 Western (genre) films
Films directed by Herbert I. Leeds
Cisco Kid
American black-and-white films
1940s English-language films
1940s American films